Kaba, a twin volcano with Mount Hitam in Bengkulu Province of Indonesia, has an elongated summit crater complex dominated by three large historically active craters trending ENE from the summit to the upper NE flank. The SW-most crater of Gunung Kaba, Kawah Lama, is the largest. Most historical eruptions have affected only the summit region of the volcano. They mostly originated from the central summit craters, although the upper-NE flank crater Kawah Vogelsang also produced explosions during the 19th and 20th centuries. In 1833 an eruption ejected water from the crater lake, forming lahars that produced damage and fatalities at Talang, Klingi, and Bliti villages.

See also
 List of volcanoes in Indonesia

References

External links
 Volcanological Survey of Indonesia

Stratovolcanoes of Indonesia
Subduction volcanoes
Active volcanoes
Volcanoes of Sumatra
Mountains of Sumatra
Volcanic crater lakes
Holocene stratovolcanoes